Traudl Treichl (born 12 March 1950, in Lenggries) is a retired German alpine skier who competed in the 1972 Winter Olympics.

External links
 sports-reference.com
 http://data.fis-ski.com/dynamic/athlete-biography.html?sector=AL&listid=&competitorid=62210

1950 births
Living people
Olympic alpine skiers of West Germany
Alpine skiers at the 1972 Winter Olympics
German female alpine skiers
People from Bad Tölz-Wolfratshausen
Sportspeople from Upper Bavaria
20th-century German women